Stahlman Point is a mountain that lies in Linn County, Oregon, in the Willamette National Forest about two miles south of the town of Detroit.

Stahlman Point is best known for being a hiking area. The top provides views of Detroit Lake, the small town of Idanha, and Mt. Jefferson.

References

Mountains of Linn County, Oregon
Mountains of Oregon